Theodore John Kent (October 6, 1901 – June 17, 1986) was an American film editor who was nominated for Best Film Editing at the 1964 Academy Awards for the film Father Goose.  He worked on over 150 films from 1929 to 1967, including many classic Universal horror films.

Selected filmography

Blindfold (1966)
Mirage (1965)
Father Goose (1964)
Island of the Blue Dolphins (1964)
That Touch of Mink (1962)
Operation Petticoat (1959)
Tammy and the Bachelor (1957)
The Private War of Major Benson (1955)
Creature from the Black Lagoon (1954)
Francis Joins the WACS (1954)
Gunsmoke (1953)
Bonzo Goes to College (1952)
Ma and Pa Kettle at the Fair (1952)
The Battle at Apache Pass (1952)
Bedtime for Bonzo (1951)
Johnny Stool Pigeon (1949)
The Pecos Pistol (1949)
Yes Sir, That's My Baby (1949)
Letter from an Unknown Woman (1948)
 Time Out of Mind (1947)
Lady on a Train (1945)
Patrick the Great (1945)
Christmas Holiday (1944)
The Amazing Mrs. Holliday (1943)
Hers to Hold (1943)
His Butler's Sister (1943)
Broadway (1942)
The Ghost of Frankenstein (1942)
Hellzapoppin' (1942)
Madame Spy (1942)
Appointment for Love (1941)
The Black Cat (1941)
Mr. Dynamite (1941)
The Wolf Man (1941)
 Enemy Agent (1940)
 Black Diamonds (1940)
Son of Frankenstein (1939)
The Sun Never Sets  (1939)
 Missing Evidence (1939)
Mad About Music (1938)
 Service de Luxe (1938)
Merry Go Round of 1938 (1937)
 The Magnificent Brute (1936)
My Man Godfrey (1936)
Show Boat (1936)
Three Smart Girls (1936)
 Straight from the Heart (1935)
Bride of Frankenstein (1935)
Remember Last Night? (1935)
One More River (1934)
The Invisible Man (1933)
They Just Had to Get Married (1932)
The Foreign Legion (1928)
Uncle Tom's Cabin (1927)

References

External links

1901 births
1986 deaths
People from Illinois
American film editors